Abdullah bin Abdulaziz Al Rabeeah is a Saudi pediatric surgeon. He has filled a number of supervisory and advisory roles in Saudi Arabia, including Minister of Health, Advisor to the Royal Court, and Supervisor General of the international aid agency KSrelief.

Early life and education
Abdullah bin Abdulaziz Al Rabeeah was born in Mecca, Saudi Arabia, on 23 February 1955. 

Al Rabeeah attended King Saud University, Riyadh where he obtained his Bachelor of Medicine and Bachelor of Surgery (MBBS) degrees in July 1979. He interned in August 1980 at King Khalid University hospital, Riyadh. In 1981, Al Rabeeah was formally licensed to practice medicine. He studied at the University of Alberta Hospital, Edmonton (1985) and IWK Hospital for Children, Dalhousie University, Halifax, Nova Scotia (1987) where he completed Fellowships in General and Pediatric Surgery, respectively.

Career

Supervisor General of the King Salman Humanitarian Aid and Relief Centre 
Abdullah bin Abdulaziz Al Rabeeah currently serves as the Supervisor General of the King Salman Humanitarian Aid and Relief Centre (known as KSrelief), headquartered in Riyadh.

He also concurrently holds the position of Advisor to the Royal Court. KSrelief was inaugurated on 13 May 2015 by the Custodian of the Two Holy Mosques, King Salman Bin Abdulaziz Al Saud; its purpose is to serve both as an aid-monitoring organization and as a direct provider for Saudi humanitarian aid and relief being administered worldwide.

When Al Rabeeah began KSrelief, he recognized that the organization's mandate was unlike anything previously seen in the Kingdom. Starting with fewer than 50 employees, today the center's numbers have reached 195 and KSrelief has accomplished a great deal in terms of humanitarian aid and relief worldwide.  As Supervisor General, Al Rabeeah's role is to steer international efforts to provide impartial, objective aid outside of Saudi Arabia to those in need. Working both unilaterally and with an impressive list of humanitarian and governmental partners, as of January 2017 Al Rabeeah has overseen 176 aid and relief projects in 37 countries. Major focuses of the projects include food security, health, water and sanitation, education, women and children, vaccination and shelter.  The centre is also working on instituting both a volunteer programme and a humanitarian research centre.

When asked about his devotion to humanitarian causes, Al Rabeeah gives all the credit to the Custodian of the Two Holy Mosques, King Salman, saying, "The Custodian of the Two Holy Mosques, King Salman bin Abdulaziz Al Saud's, guidelines stress that our centre shall perform its duties in an unbiased way, based solely upon need and regardless to any other considerations."  The centre is also to abide by approved international rules and widely-accepted humanitarian concepts.

Throughout the course of his career, Al Rabeeah has held many positions of authority, achieving a successful balance between his duties as administrator, politician and physician to the benefit of all. His dedication to public service as his primary goal allows him to carry out diverse duties with a singular focus on serving his country and humanity.

Previous positions 
Due to Al Rabeeah's success in his various roles, the late King Abdullah bin Abdulaziz Al Saud chose him to take on the key and challenging position of Minister of Health for the Kingdom of Saudi Arabia.  Al Rabeeah readily accepted the position and was appointed as such on 14 February 2009.

Some of his notable successes during his tenure as Minister of Health are:
 Launched the Integrated and Comprehensive Healthcare Plan.  The implementation of the ICHCP had a significant impact on reforming the Kingdom's entire health care sector, with the goal of providing the highest possible standard of care for all.
 Established new hospitals (79) and Primary Health Care Centres (824) as well as upgrading many existing health facilities.
 The approval of building 5 Medical Cities North, South, East and West (Quaternary Level) as part of the ICHCP by Royal Decree.  Budget allocated for the cities amounted to US$3.7 billion, which made Saudi MoH one of the largest investors in the Middle East.
 Electronic Medical Referral System Ehalati.  The medical referral is the process of directing or redirecting the patient to the optimal level, usually from the lower potential levels to the greatest potential ones.
 One-Day Surgery programme to optimize Operating Room resources and help alleviate hospital bed shortages.
 Home Health Care Programme.
 Implementation of immediate reporting of all Sentinel Events via text and dashboard, report and follow-up.
 Centralized database for medication use by clinical and medical staff to record medication side effects and contra-indications to minimize medical errors. (Micromedex).
 Connectivity of National IT Services for all medical facilities.
 Patient Rights and Relations Program.
 Visiting Professorship Program to serve remote areas.
 Electronic Citizens Voice (public comments related to Health sector).
 Assistant Deputy Minister Department for Health Economy and Investment.
 PPP (Private Public Partnership) for government health investment (SEHA).
 National and International Accreditation for health facilities.
 National Health Information Centre. 
 Unified payroll for medical and clinical staff to ensure fairness.
 Implemented Incentive Bonus System based on physician performance.
 Appointed the first woman in the history of the MoH to the level of Assistant Deputy Minister for Medical Services.
 Hajj - MoH: Improved Hajj Medical Services to ensure further safety of the Pilgrims as well as implementing the Mass Gathering Concept (Jeddah Declaration) as endorsed by the World Health Organization. The Kingdom of Saudi Arabia is now considered a world-renowned authority on Mass Gatherings, and is a resource for research and reference in this area.
 Providing specialized services for life-threatening cases such as open-heart surgeries, by-passes and other serious cardiac ailments, as well as ongoing provision of regular medical services as necessary.
 Implemented the highest-efficiency international and national surveillance systems and expertise to minimize infectious diseases during Hajj season.
Al Rabeeah served as Minister of Health until 21 April 2014.

Other significant projects launched during Al Rabeeah's career 
 Ministry of National Guard (National Guard Health Affairs)
 King Saud bin Abdulaziz University for Health Sciences (KSAU-HS) 
 King Abdullah Specialist Children's Hospital 
 King Abdulaziz Cardiac Centre
 Trauma Surgical Tower (Sulaiman Al Rajhi Centre)
 King Abdullah International Medical Research Centre
 King Faisal Specialist Hospital and Research Centre. Establishing and commissioning of major projects and Centres of Excellence both in Riyadh and Jeddah, especially
 King Abdullah Centre for Cancer and Liver Diseases for Children. 
 King Faisal Specialist Hospital and Research Centre, Jeddah.

Conjoined twins
As a pediatric surgeon, Al Rabeeah is passionate about his chosen specialty, and throughout his various appointments has continued to perform separations of conjoined twins.  He performed his first separation of female Saudi conjoined twins at King Faisal Specialist Hospital & Research Centre, Riyadh in December 1990, as well as a further three. Since 1996, Al Rabeeah and the Saudi National Team have reviewed 99 cases and performed 42 successful separations of conjoined twins from 19 countries. 38 of these surgeries were carried out at the Ministry of National Guard Health Affairs, King Abdulaziz Medical City, Riyadh. All separations have been fully sponsored by the leadership of the Kingdom of Saudi Arabia.

One of the most complex cases that Al Rabeeah undertook was at the request of the late King Abdullah bin Abdulaziz Al Saud concerning Malaysian conjoined twins, Ahmed and Mohammed. The parents pleaded to the Kingdom of Saudi Arabia to help them. Accepting the challenge, Al Rabeeah agreed to the late King Abdullah's request and performed the surgery on the twins in September 2002. The numerous surgical phases took 23.5 hours and resulted in a successful separation of the boys. To this date, Al Rabeeah considers this one of the most difficult, but also as one of his proudest accomplishments as a surgeon.

Initially, the conjoined twins team consisted of only 10% Saudis, today it boasts all Saudi members in the different specialties.

Based on his knowledge and commitment to these special babies, Al Rabeeah has written a book in Arabic entitled My Experience with Conjoined Twins; this book has been abridged in English (4 editions). He has published three additional books, and authored entries in 103 scientific/medical/abstract publications.

Al Rabeeah is one of the founding members of the Riyadh Pediatric Surgery Club (1993), and holds the position of Chairman to this day. The Club now has more than 200 members.

Other Positions Held  
 1992 – present: Head of the Surgical and Multidisciplinary Team for the Saudi National Conjoined Twins Programme
 May 2011: President of the Executive Board of the Arab Health Ministers' Council
 August 2010: Chairman of the Board of Directors, King Faisal Specialist Hospital and Research Centre
 2003 – 2009: Chief Executive Officer of National Guard Health Affairs
 2005 – 2009: President of King Saud bin Abdulaziz University for Health Sciences
 2009 – 2016: Member of the Board of Trustees, King Abdullah University of Science and Technology
 Chairman, Co-Chair, and Honorary Member with many Executive Committees in the Royal Cabinet, Ministry of Health, Saudi Council for Health Specialties and other Government Agencies and Universities
 Chairman of the Riyadh Pediatric Surgery Club
 Chairman of the Board of Trustees for the Saudi Council for Health Specialties
 Chairman, The National Health Insurance Council

Personal life 
Al Rabeeah is the father of eight children - seven girls (including a set of identical twins), and one boy. His son, Khalid, followed in his footsteps and is a medical consultant specializing in urology; Khalid also began his career by studying at King Saud University and completing his Fellowship in Canada.

Abdullah Al Rabeeah is known for maintaining good relations with the people around him.  He still stays in touch with patients and their families, many of whom have acknowledged and praised his extraordinary contribution and impact upon their lives.

Recognitions  
 November 2016, Humanitarian Award from the Gulf Cooperation Council (GCC) – Regional Network for Social Responsibility (member of United Nations Global Compact) – Kingdom of Bahrain.
 May 2015, Honour Award for Unique Contribution to Health Care, Kingdom of Saudi Arabia – 18th Graduation Ceremony for Unique Contributions.  
 December 2012, Sheikh Hamdan Bin Rashid Al Maktoum Award for Medical Sciences for Outstanding Medical Personalities in the Arab World.
 February 2011, Fellowship through Distinction from the Faculty of Public Health (FPH), Royal College of Physicians of the United Kingdom.  
 April 2011, Mary Kingsley Medal – (Highest Honours Award) from the Liverpool of Tropical Medicine. 
 May 2011, First Class Distinction Award from Al Imam Muhammed bin Saud Islamic University.
 March 2010, Recognition by Arabian Business Magazine as being the 45th Most Influential Arab.
 January 2008, Meritorious Award - The General Board of Polish Medical Doctors Association. 
 August 2005, Medal of Merit, Commander Class from the President of Poland.
 November 2003, the King Abdulaziz Excellence Degree Medal.
 November 2002, King Abdulaziz First Degree Medal.

References

1954 births
Living people
King Saud University alumni
King Khalid University alumni
University of Alberta alumni
Dalhousie University alumni
Academic staff of King Saud University
Saudi Arabian pediatric surgeons
Saudi Arabia
People from Riyadh
Heads of universities and colleges in Saudi Arabia
21st-century Saudi Arabian politicians